Petras Repšys  (born 1940) is a Lithuanian artist.

In 1994 the University of Vilnius adopted his rendition of its coat of arms. His fresco "The Seasons of the Year" is prominently displayed at the University.

See also
List of Lithuanian painters

References
  Petras Repšys. Lithuanian Artists' Association. Accessed 2010-11-27.
 Universitas Vilnensis 2004. University of Vilnius. Accessed 2010-11-27.

This article was initially translated from the Lithuanian Wikipedia.

Lithuanian painters
1940 births
Living people
Recipients of the Lithuanian National Prize